Bruns is a surname, and may refer to:

 Dmitri Bruns (1929–2020), Estonian architect and architecture theorist
 Franklin Richard Bruns Jr. (1912–1979), of Maryland
 George Bruns (1914–1983), American music composer
 Karl Bruns (fl. 1950s), a retired West German slalom canoeist
 Ludwig Bruns (1858–1916), German neurologist
 Maddux Bruns (born c. 2003), American baseball player
 Manfred Bruns (born 1934), German gay civil rights activist
 Neville Bruns (born 1958), Australian rules footballer
 Paul von Bruns (1846–1916), German surgeon, son of Victor
 Phil Bruns (1931–2012), American television actor
 Roger Bruns (born 1941), American author and the former deputy director for the National Archives and Records Administration of the United States.
 Thomas Bruns (born 1992), Dutch football player
 Thomas Bruns (poet) (born 1976), German writer and poet
 Victor Bruns (1904–1996), German composer and bassoonist
 Victor von Bruns (1812–1883), German surgeon, father of Paul

See also 
 Brun (disambiguation)
 The Brunswickan
 Burns (disambiguation)

Low German surnames